Franco Nahuel Ravizzoli (born 9 July 1997) is an Argentinian professional footballer who plays as a goalkeeper for  club Milton Keynes Dons.

Club career

Early career
Born in Mar del Plata, Argentina, Ravizzoli played for the Independiente and Quilmes youth teams before joining the academy of River Plate towards the end of 2012 at the age of 15, where he progressed through the ranks eventually reaching the senior reserve team. After leaving the club in mid-2018, Ravizzoli played for Merlo and Morón, and trained with Spanish club Valencia.

Eastbourne Borough
In January 2022, Ravizzoli signed for English sixth-tier club Eastbourne Borough. He featured a total of 35 times for the club across the 2019–20 and 2020–21 seasons.

Milton Keynes Dons
On 16 June 2021, Ravizzoli signed a professional contract with League One club Milton Keynes Dons having spent the latter half of the 2020–21 season training with the team. On 31 July 2021, he made his debut in an EFL Cup first round 5–0 defeat away to AFC Bournemouth. On 11 January 2022, Ravizzoli made his first league start in a 1–0 home win over rivals AFC Wimbledon, keeping a clean sheet in the process.

Career statistics

References

1997 births
Living people
Argentine footballers
Club Atlético River Plate footballers
Deportivo Merlo footballers
Deportivo Morón footballers
Eastbourne Borough F.C. players
Milton Keynes Dons F.C. players
Association football goalkeepers
Argentine expatriate footballers
Argentine expatriates in England
Expatriate footballers in England
Club Atlético Independiente footballers
Quilmes Atlético Club footballers
English Football League players
Sportspeople from Mar del Plata